The 2015–16 Detroit Titans men's basketball team represented the University of Detroit Mercy during the 2015–16 NCAA Division I men's basketball season. Their head coach was Ray McCallum in his eighth season. The Titans played their home games at Calihan Hall and were members of the Horizon League. They finished the season 16–15, 9–9 in Horizon League play to finish in sixth place. They defeated Youngstown State in the first round of the Horizon League tournament to advance to the second round where they lost to Wright State.

On April 1, head coach Ray McCallum was fired. He finished at Detroit with an eight-year record of 130–132.

Roster

Schedule

|-
!colspan=9 style="background:#F5002F; color:#0048E0;"| Regular season

|-
!colspan=9 style="background:#F5002F; color:#0048E0;"| Horizon League regular season

|-
!colspan=9 style="background:#F5002F; color:#0048E0;"| Horizon League tournament

References

Detroit Titans
Detroit Mercy Titans men's basketball seasons
Detroit Titans men's b
Detroit Titans men's b